José Alberto may refer to:

 José Alberto "El Canario" (born 1959), Dominican musician
 José Alberto (footballer) (born 1982), Spanish footballer

See also